EO is a 2022 drama road movie directed by Jerzy Skolimowski. Inspired by Robert Bresson's 1966 film Au Hasard Balthazar, it follows the life of a donkey born in a Polish circus. The film premiered in competition at the Cannes Film Festival in May 2022, where it won the Jury Prize, tying with The Eight Mountains. Submitted by Poland, EO was nominated for the Academy Award for Best International Feature Film at the 95th Academy Awards.

Plot 
EO is a donkey working for a Polish circus. He performs in an act with Kasandra, who loves and protects him. When Animal Rights activists help get the circus shut down, EO is taken away, and is brought to a horse stable to work. In the truck being transported, and at the stables, EO sees horses running free, and being pampered. After knocking over a shelf of trophies, EO is sent to a farm, where he seems depressed and won’t eat. He gives rides to children through woods, where trees continue to be cut down to create space for man.  

One night Kasandra visits him, bringing him a carrot muffin for his birthday, and telling him “may all your dreams come true.” When she leaves, EO gets through the fence and tries to follow her, getting lost. EO walks through the dark forest among various non-human life. Hunters with laser scopes begin shooting. EO observes a mortally wounded wolf. Sometime later EO walks through an empty town, and in a store window sees tropical fish in an aquarium. He ends up at a soccer game, and his baying distracts a penalty shot, angering the losing team. The winning team takes EO with them to a local bar. That night, members of the losing team ransack the bar, and upon seeing EO, beat him, nearly to death. A four-legged, dog-like robot is seen moving through grass.
 
EO is at an animal hospital, where a janitor questions why the Vet is trying to save him. Later EO is working at a fur factory where a man shocks and kills terrified foxes. EO kicks the man in the head, possibly killing him. EO is loaded into a truck with other animals, though he isn’t on the manifest. The driver, Mateo, stops at a rest stop, and gives food to a woman. An unknown figure slits Mateo’s throat. Nearby a priest named Vito is traveling to his family home, and sees EO tied to a pole, as the police investigate Mateo’s murder. Vito takes EO with him. Like Kasandra, Vito talks to EO like a person, even admitting he has eaten donkey meat sausage. Vito and his step mother, The Countess, argue about Vito’s gambling. EO notices the gate into The Countess’ estate has opened, and he leaves. EO walks over a stone bridge in front of a large dam, watching the water flow. Sometime later EO is with cows being led into a slaughterhouse. The screen goes to black, and we hear the sound of a captive bolt pistol.

Cast
 Sandra Drzymalska as Kasandra
 Lorenzo Zurzolo as Vito
 Mateusz Kościukiewicz as Mateo
 Isabelle Huppert as the Countess

The donkey Eo is portrayed by six donkeys: Ettore, Hola, Marietta, Mela, Rocco, and Tako.

Reception

Critical reception
On the review aggregation website Rotten Tomatoes, EO holds an approval rating of 96% based on 128 reviews from critics, with an average rating of 8.1/10. The website's consensus reads, "Bravely updating Bresson with brilliant results, EO is a donkey-driven drama that'll stubbornly stick with you long after the credits roll." On Metacritic, which uses a weighted average, the film holds a score of 85 out of 100 based on 30 reviews indicating “universal acclaim”.

EO was ranked fourth on Cahiers du Cinémas top 10 films of 2022 list.

Accolades
EO was submitted by Poland for the 2023 Academy Award for Best International Feature Film, and made the December shortlist.

See also
 List of submissions to the 95th Academy Awards for Best International Feature Film
 List of Polish submissions for the Academy Award for Best International Feature Film

References

External links
 
 

2022 films
2020s Polish-language films
Polish drama films
Italian drama films
Films directed by Jerzy Skolimowski
Films with screenplays by Jerzy Skolimowski
Films about donkeys
Fictional donkeys
2022 drama films
2020s drama road movies
2020s road movies
Italian road movies
Italian drama road movies